John Joseph Fowler (1 December 1850 – 30 November 1910) was a New Zealand cricketer who played first-class cricket for Canterbury from 1873 to 1882.

Fowler was a middle-order batsman and excellent fieldsman. His highest score in first-class cricket was 65, the highest score on either side, when Canterbury beat Otago in 1879–80. Born in Nelson, he was the only New Zealand-born member of Canterbury's fifteen-man team that beat the touring Australians in 1877–78.

He died in hospital in Nelson after a long illness, one day before his 60th birthday. He was survived by his daughters.

References

External links
 

1850 births
1910 deaths
New Zealand cricketers
Canterbury cricketers
Cricketers from Nelson, New Zealand